Samuel McLean may refer to:
Samuel McLean (U.S. Consul) (1797–1881)
Samuel McLean (congressman) (1826-1877)
Samuel McLean (politician), politician of the Canadian province of Newfoundland and Labrador